Dr. Ewald Kleisinger  (11 June 1912, Vienna – 25 March 2000, Vienna) was from 1966, an Austrian Righteous Among the Nations and the husband of Danuta Kleisinger.
 
He worked, like his wife Danuta Kleisinger, for the Polish resistance movement in World War II during the occupation of Poland (1939–1945).

External links 

 Austrian Righteous Among the Nations (German)
 Ewald Kleisinger – his activity to save Jews' lives during the Holocaust, at Yad Vashem website

Austrian Righteous Among the Nations
People from Vienna
1912 births
2000 deaths